The Report on the Subject of Manufactures, generally referred to by its shortened title Report on Manufactures, is the third major report, and magnum opus, of American Founding Father and first United States Treasury Secretary Alexander Hamilton. It was presented to the US Congress on December 5, 1791.

It laid forth economic principles rooted in both the mercantilist system of Elizabeth I's England and the practices of Jean-Baptiste Colbert of France. The main ideas of the Report would later be incorporated into the "American System" program by US Senator Henry Clay of Kentucky and his Whig Party. Abraham Lincoln, who called himself a "Henry Clay tariff Whig" during his early years, would later make the principles cornerstones, together with his opposition to the institution and the expansion of slavery, of the fledgling Republican Party.

Hamilton's ideas would form the basis for the American School of economics.

Economic plan
Hamilton reasoned that to secure American independence, the United States needed to have a sound policy of encouraging the growth of manufacturing and ensure its future as a permanent feature of the economic system of the nation. He argued these could be achieved by bounties or subsidies to industry, regulation of trade with moderate tariffs (which were intended not to discourage imports but to raise revenue to support American manufacturing by subsidies), and other government encouragement. These policies would not only promote the growth of manufacturing but also provide diversified employment opportunities and promote immigration to the young United States. They would also expand the applications of technology and science for all quarters of the economy, including agriculture. In his report, Hamilton advocated rewarding those bringing "improvements and secrets of extraordinary value” " to the United States. That contributed to making the United States a haven for industrial spies.

Tariffs

Hamilton reasoned that tariffs issued in moderation would raise revenue to fund the nation. The tariff could also be used to encourage domestic or national manufacturing and growth of the economy by applying the funds raised in part towards subsidies, then called bounties, to manufacturers. Hamilton sought to use the tariff for the following:

 Protect domestic infant industries until they could achieve economies of scale and be able to compete with more established firms abroad.
 Raise revenue to pay the expenses of government.
 Raise revenue to directly support manufacturing through bounties (subsidies).

Industrial subsidies
Hamilton reasoned that bounties (subsidies) to industry, which would rely on funds raised by moderate tariffs, would be the best means of growing manufacturing without decreasing the supply or increasing the prices of goods. Such encouragement by direct support would make American enterprise competitive and independent along with the nation as a whole. In part subsidies would be used for the following:

 Encourage the nation's spirit of enterprise, innovation, and invention.
 Support internal improvements, including roads and canals to increase and to encourage domestic commerce.
 Grow the infant nation to a manufacturing power that would be independent of control by foreign powers by relying on their goods for domestic, especially defense supplies.

Adoption by Congress
Though Congress refused to accept Hamilton's proposals in 1791 because of opposition from Madison and his supporters, much of Hamilton's third report would later be adopted by the US Congress despite continued opposition to the support of industry by subsidies. Both sides agreed that manufacturing independence was desirable and necessary but disagreed on how to obtain it. The Jeffersonian Democratic-Republican Party's main objection to subsidy was their fear that subsidy would lead to corruption and favoritism of certain sections of the new nation over others: the north over the agrarian south. That divide would return again and again in issues of economic policy until the outbreak of the American Civil War.

It is often thought that Hamilton's report was completely ignored, but "Hamilton worked to ensure that Congress enacted virtually every tariff recommendation in the report within five months of its delivery."

Hamilton's revenue-based trade policy, with its more moderate tariffs, meant that by 1794, manufacturers had switched their support from the Federalists to the Democratic-Republicans, who favored higher, more protectionist tariffs.

Opposition
Leading opponents of Alexander Hamilton's economic plan included Thomas Jefferson (until later years) and James Madison, who were opposed to the use of subsidy to industry, along with most of their fledgling Democratic-Republican Party. Instead of bounties they reasoned in favor of high tariffs and restrictions on imports to increase manufacturing, which was favored by the manufacturers themselves, who desired protection of their home market. Although the Jeffersonian stance originally favored an "agrarian" economy of farmers, it changed over time to encompass many of Hamilton's original ideas: Also, "the Madison administration helped give rise to the first truly protectionist tariff in U.S. history."

See also
 First Report on the Public Credit – Hamilton's report on public finance
 Second Report on Public Credit – Hamilton's report on national banking
 Federalist Party – Hamilton's political party
 Political economy – overview of economic theory research
 Free trade economics – opposing school of thought
Report on a Plan for the Further Support of Public Credit – Hamilton's report on dealing with public credit after his resignation

References

Sources

Further reading
 
Croly, Herbert, The Promise of American Life (2005 reprint)
Joseph Dorfman. The Economic Mind in American Civilization, 1606–1865 (1947) vol. 2
Joseph Dorfman. The Economic Mind in American Civilization, 1865–1918 (1949) vol. 3
Foner, Eric. Free Soil, Free Labor, Free Men: The Ideology of the Republican Party before the Civil War (1970)
Gill, William J. Trade Wars Against America: A History of United States Trade and Monetary Policy (1990)
Lind, Michael Hamilton's Republic: Readings in the American Democratic Nationalist Tradition (1997)
Lind, Michael What Lincoln Believed: The Values and Convictions of America's Greatest President (2004)
 
Richardson, Heather Cox. The Greatest Nation of the Earth: Republican Economic Policies during the Civil War (1997)
Edward Stanwood, American Tariff Controversies in the Nineteenth Century (1903; reprint 1974), 2 vols.

External links

 Excerpts from the Report (Columbia University Press, University of Chicago)

1792 in the United States
United States documents
Economic history of the United States
Economic ideologies
Preclassical economics
Works by Alexander Hamilton
American political philosophy literature
1791 documents